Marina Yaguello (born 19 May 1944 Paris) is a French linguist. She is a professor emeritus at the University of Paris VII.

Life 
A linguist, Marina Yaguello is of Russian native speaker, but she is interested in French, English and Wolof.

She teaches at the University of Paris 7 as professor emeritus.

She has written numerous books on sociolinguistics, in particular concerning the relationship of women to language and the feminization of language: Les Mots et les Femmes, in 1981 and The Sex of Words in 1989 or Les Fous du Langues. Her early interest in the subject is highlighted in the debates on inclusive writing taking place in 2020.

In 2020, she was invited by Bernard Cerquiglini,  to participate in a round table bringing together the authors (Marie-Jo Mathieu, Nicole Cholewka and Martine Coutier) on the Guide d'aide à la féminisation des noms de métiers, titres, grades et fonctions (1999).   The purpose of the round table was to draw up an inventory of feminization in France, and resulting in a book by the Institute of French Linguistics published by Honoré Champion.

Works 

 Les Mots et les Femmes (1978), Payot.
 Alice au pays du langage, Pour comprendre la linguistique (1981), Seuil.
 Les Fous du langage, des langues imaginaires et leurs inventeurs (1984), Seuil, .
 Catalogue des idées reçues sur la langue, Seuil, 1988.
 Histoire de Lettres, Des lettres et des sons (1990), Seuil.
 En écoutant parler la langue (1991), Seuil.
 Grammaire exploratoire de l'anglais (1991), Hachette.
 J'apprends le wolof, Damay jang wolof (1991), Karthala (with Jean-Léopold Diouf).
 T'ar ta gueule à la récré ! (1991), Seuil (with Nestor Salas).
 La Planète des langues (1993), Seuil.
 Subjecthood and Subjectivity (1994), Ophrys (collective work).
 Le Sexe des mots (1995), Seuil.
 Language Through The Looking-Glass (1998), Oxford University Press.
 Petits Faits de langue (1998), Seuil.
 Le Grand livre de la langue française (2003), Seuil (with Claire Blanche-Benveniste, Jean-Paul Colin, Françoise Gadet et al.).
 Les Langues imaginaires : mythes, utopies, fantasmes, chimères et fictions linguistiques (2006), Seuil.
 La Grammaire française dans tous ses états (2021), Points

References 

1944 births
Linguists from France
Living people
20th-century linguists
21st-century linguists
Women linguists
Academic staff of Paris Diderot University